Fairfax Community Church (Fairfax.cc) is an evangelical congregation located in Fairfax County, Virginia.  The church is affiliated with the Church of God, Anderson, Indiana. By membership, the church is classified as a megachurch, with an average weekly attendance in 2012 of 2,158.  It served as a satellite site for the 2007-2010 Willow Creek Association Global Leadership Summit.

History
Fairfax Community Church was founded in 1929. The church facilities were located on Hunt Road in Fairfax starting in 1934. The congregation moved to new facilities on Braddock Road in 2005.

Denominational affiliation
This church is part of the Church of God Reformation Movement. The denomination today is commonly called "Church of God, Anderson, Indiana" to distinguish it from numerous other fellowships using the name "Church of God."

Other affiliations
Fairfax Community Church maintains close ties with Anderson University in Anderson, Indiana, the denomination's flagship school. Senior Pastor Rodney Stafford gave the commencement address to the March 2005 graduating class.

References

External links
 www.Fairfax.cc Official web site
 Church Staff Listing
 The Great Room Coffee Shop

Evangelical churches in Virginia
Christian organizations established in 1929
Evangelical megachurches in the United States
Megachurches in Virginia
1929 establishments in Virginia
Churches in Fairfax County, Virginia
Megachurches in Indiana